Aquatic plants are plants that have adapted to living in aquatic environments (saltwater or freshwater). They are also referred to as hydrophytes or macrophytes to distinguish them from algae and other microphytes. A macrophyte is a plant that grows in or near water and is either emergent, submergent, or floating. In lakes and rivers macrophytes provide cover for fish, substrate for aquatic invertebrates, produce oxygen, and act as food for some fish and wildlife.

Macrophytes are primary producers and are the basis of the food web for many organisms. They have a significant effect on soil chemistry and light levels  as they slow down the flow of water and capture pollutants and trap sediments. Excess sediment will settle into the benthos aided by the reduction of flow rates caused by the presence of plant stems, leaves and roots. Some  plants have the capability of  absorbing  pollutants into their tissue. Seaweeds are multicellular marine algae and, although their ecological impact is similar to other larger water plants, they are not typically referred to as macrophytes.

Aquatic plants require special adaptations for living submerged in water, or at the water's surface. The most common adaptation is the presence of lightweight internal packing cells, aerenchyma, but floating leaves and finely dissected leaves are also common. Aquatic plants can only grow in water or in soil that is frequently saturated with water. They are therefore a common component of wetlands. One of the largest aquatic plants in the world is the Amazon water lily; one of the smallest is the minute duckweed. Many small aquatic animals use plants such as duckweed for a home, or for protection from predators. Some other familiar examples of aquatic plants include floating heart, water lily, lotus, and water hyacinth.

Historically, aquatic plants have been less studied than terrestrial plants.

Distribution
The principal factor controlling the distribution of aquatic plants is the availability of water. However, other factors may also control their distribution including nutrient availability, disturbance from waves, grazing, and salinity. Some aquatic plants are able to thrive in brackish, saline, and salt water.

Evolution
Aquatic plants have adapted to live in either freshwater or saltwater. Aquatic vascular plants have originated on multiple occasions in different plant families; they can be ferns or angiosperms (including both monocots and dicots). The only angiosperms capable of growing completely submerged in seawater are the seagrasses. Examples are found in genera such as Thalassia and Zostera. An aquatic origin of angiosperms is supported by the evidence that several of the earliest known fossil angiosperms were aquatic. Aquatic plants are phylogenetically well dispersed across the angiosperms, with at least 50 independent origins, although they comprise less than 2% of the angiosperm species.  Archaefructus represents one of the oldest, most complete angiosperm fossils which is around 125 million years old. These plants require special adaptations for living submerged in water or floating at the surface.

Aquatic adaptation

Reproduction
Although most aquatic angiosperms can reproduce by flowering and setting seeds, many have also evolved to have extensive asexual reproduction by means of rhizomes, turions, and fragments in general.

Photosynthesis 
Submerged aquatic plants have more restricted access to carbon as carbon dioxide compared to terrestrial plants. They may also  experience reduced light levels. The diffuse boundary layers (DBLs) around submerged leaves and photosynthetic stems. Aquatic plants have DBLs that vary based on the leaves' thickness, shape and density and they are the main factor responsible for the greatly reduced rate of gaseous transport across the leaf/water boundary and therefore greatly inhibit transport of carbon dioxide transport. To overcome this limitation, many aquatic plants have evolved to metabolise bicarbonate ions as a source of carbon.

Environmental variables affect the instantaneous photosynthetic rates of aquatic plants and the photosynthetic enzymes pigments. In water, light intensity rapidly decreases with depth. Respiration is also higher in the dark per the unit volume of the medium they live in.

Morphology
Fully submerged aquatic plants have little need for stiff or woody tissue as they are able to maintain their position in the water using buoyancy typically from gas filled lacunaa or turgid Aerenchyma cells. When removed from the water, such plants are typically limp and loose turgor rapidly.

Those living in rivers do, however, need sufficient structural xylem to avoid being damaged by fast flowing water and they also need strong mechanisms of attachment to avoid being uprooted by river flow.

Many fully submerged plants have finely dissected leaves, probably to reduce drag in rivers and to provide a much increased surface area for interchange of minerals and gasses.
Some species of plants such as Ranunculus aquatilis have  two different leaf forms with finely dissected leaves that are fully submerged and entire leaves on the surface of the water.

Some still-water plants can alter their position in the water column at different seasons. One notable example is Water soldier which rests as a rootless rosette on the bottom of the water body but slowly floats to the surface in late Spring so that its inflorescence can emerge into the air. While it is ascending through the water column it produces roots and vegetative daughter plants by means of rhizomes. When flowering is complete, the plant descends through the water column and the roots atrophy.

In floating aquatic angiosperms, the leaves have evolved to only have stomata on the top surface to make use of atmospheric carbon dioxide. Gas exchange primarily occurs through the top surface of the leaf due to the position of the stomata, and the stomata are in a permanently open state. Due to their aquatic surroundings, the plants are not at risk of losing water through the stomata and therefore face no risk of dehydration. For carbon fixation, some aquatic angiosperms are able to uptake CO2 from bicarbonate in the water, a trait that does not exist in terrestrial plants. Angiosperms that use - can keep  levels satisfactory, even in basic environments with low carbon levels.

Buoyancy 
Due to their environment, aquatic plants experience buoyancy which counteracts their weight. Because of this, their cell covering are far more flexible and soft, due to a lack of pressure that terrestrial plants experience. Green algae are also known to have extremely thin cell walls due to their aquatic surroundings, and research has shown that green algae is the closest ancestor to living terrestrial and aquatic plants. Terrestrial plants have rigid cell walls meant for withstanding harsh weather, as well as keeping the plant upright as the plant resists gravity. Gravitropism, along with phototropism and hydrotropism, are traits believed to have evolved during the transition from an aquatic to terrestrial habitat. Terrestrial plants no longer had unlimited access to water and had to evolve to search for nutrients in their new surroundings as well as develop cells with new sensory functions, such as statocytes.

Terrestrial plants in aquatic environments 
Terrestrial plants may undergo physiological changes when submerged due to flooding. When submerged, new leaf growth has been found to have thinner leaves and thinner cell walls than the leaves on the plant that grew while above water, along with oxygen levels being higher in the portion of the plant grown underwater versus the sections that grew in their terrestrial environment. This is considered a form of phenotypic plasticity as the plant, once submerged, experiences changes in morphology better suited to their new aquatic environment. However, while some terrestrial plants may be able to adapt in the short-term to an aquatic habitat, it may not be possible to reproduce underwater, especially if the plant usually relies on terrestrial pollinators.

Classification of macrophytes

Based on growth form, macrophytes can be characterised as: 
 Emergent 
 Submerged 
Rooted: rooted to the substrate
Unrooted: free-floating in the water column
Attached: attached to substrate but not by roots
 Floating-leaved
Free-floating

Emergent
An emergent plant is one which grows in water but pierces the surface so that it is partially exposed to air. Collectively, such plants are emergent vegetation.

This habit may have developed because the leaves can photosynthesize more efficiently in air and competition from submerged plants but often, the main aerial feature is the flower and the related reproductive process. The emergent habit permits pollination by wind or by flying insects.

There are many species of emergent plants, among them, the reed  (Phragmites), Cyperus papyrus, Typha species, flowering rush and wild rice species. Some species, such as purple loosestrife, may grow in water as emergent plants but they are capable of flourishing in fens or simply in damp ground.

Submerged
Submerged macrophytes completely grow under water with roots attached to the substrate (e.g. Myriophyllum spicatum) or without any root system (e.g. Ceratophyllum demersum). Helophytes are plants that grow partly submerged in marshes and regrow from buds below the water surface. Fringing stands of tall vegetation by water basins and rivers may include helophytes. Examples include stands of Equisetum fluviatile, Glyceria maxima, Hippuris vulgaris, Sagittaria, Carex, Schoenoplectus, Sparganium, Acorus, yellow flag (Iris pseudacorus), Typha and Phragmites australis.

Floating-leaved 
Floating-leaved macrophytes have root systems attached to the substrate or bottom of the body of water and with leaves that float on the water surface. Common floating leaved macrophytes are water lilies (family Nymphaeaceae), pondweeds (family Potamogetonaceae).

Free-floating 
Free-floating macrophytes are found suspended on water surface with their root not attached to the substrate, sediment, or bottom of the water body. They are easily blown by air and provide breeding ground for mosquitoes. Example include Pistia spp. commonly called water lettuce, water cabbage or Nile cabbage.

Morphological classification
The many possible classifications of aquatic plants are based upon morphology. One example has six groups as follows:
Amphiphytes: plants that are adapted to live either submerged or on land
Elodeids: stem plants that complete their entire lifecycle submerged, or with only their flowers above the waterline
Isoetids: rosette plants that complete their entire lifecycle submerged
Helophytes: plants rooted in the bottom, but with leaves above the waterline
Nymphaeids: plants rooted in the bottom, but with leaves floating on the water surface
Neuston: vascular plants that float freely in the water

Functions of macrophytes in aquatic systems
Macrophytes perform many ecosystem functions in aquatic ecosystems and provide services to human society. One of the important functions performed by macrophyte is uptake of dissolved nutrients including Nitrogen and Phosphorus. Macrophytes are widely used in constructed wetlands around the world to remove excess N and P from polluted water. Beside direct nutrient uptake, macrophytes indirectly influence nutrient cycling, especially N cycling through influencing the denitrifying bacterial functional groups that are inhabiting on roots and shoots of macrophytes. Macrophytes promote the sedimentation of suspended solids by reducing the current velocities, impede erosion by stabilising soil surfaces. Macrophytes also provide spatial heterogeneity in otherwise unstructured water column. Habitat complexity provided by macrophytes tends to increase diversity and density of both fish and invertebrates.

The additional site-specific macrophytes' value provides wildlife habitat and makes treatment systems of wastewater aesthetically satisfactory.

Uses and importance to humans

Food crops

Some aquatic plants are used by humans as a food source. Examples include wild rice (Zizania), water caltrop (Trapa natans), Chinese water chestnut (Eleocharis dulcis), Indian lotus (Nelumbo nucifera), water spinach (Ipomoea aquatica), and watercress (Rorippa nasturtium-aquaticum).

Bioassessment
A decline in a macrophyte community may indicate water quality problems and changes in the ecological status of the water body. Such problems may be the result of excessive turbidity, herbicides, or salination. Conversely, overly high nutrient levels may create an overabundance of macrophytes, which may in turn interfere with lake processing. Macrophyte levels are easy to sample, do not require laboratory analysis, and are easily used for calculating simple abundance metrics.

Potential sources of therapeutic agents
Phytochemical and pharmacological researches suggest that freshwater macrophytes, such as Centella asiatica, Nelumbo nucifera, Nasturtium officinale, Ipomoea aquatica and Ludwigia adscendens, are promising sources of anticancer and antioxidative natural products.

Hot water extracts of the stem and root of Ludwigia adscendens, as well as those of the fruit, leaf and stem of Monochoria hastata were found to have lipoxygenase inhibitory activity. Hot water extract prepared from the leaf of Ludwigia adscendens exhibits alpha-glucosidase inhibitory activity more potent than that of acarbose.

Wastewater treatment
Macrophytes have an essential role in some forms of wastewater treatment, most commonly in small scale sewage treatment using constructed wetlands or in polishing lagoons for larger schemes.

Invasive aquatic plants
The introduction of non-native aquatic plants has resulted in numerous examples across the world of such plants becoming invasive and frequently dominating the environments into which they have been introduced. Such species include Water hyacinth which is invasive in many tropical and sub-tropical locations including much of the southern US, many Asian countries and Australia. New Zealand stonecrop is a highly invasive plant in temperate climates spreading from a marginal plant to encompassing the whole body of many ponds to the almost total exclusion of other plants and wildlife

Other notable invasive plant species include floating pennywort, Curly leaved pondweed, the fern ally Water fern  and Parrot's feather. Many of these invasive plants have been sold as oxygenating plants for aquaria or decorative plants for garden ponds and have then been disposed of into the environment.

In 2012, a comprehensive overview of  alien aquatic plants in 46 European countries found 96 alien aquatic species. The aliens were primarily native to North America, Asia, and South America. The most spread alien plant in Europe was Elodea canadensis (Found in 41 European countries) followed by Azolla filiculoides in 25 countries and Vallisneria spiralis in 22 countries.

The countries with the most recorded alien aquatic plant species were France and Italy with 30 species followed by Germany with 27 species, and Belgium and Hungary with 26 species.

The European and Mediterranean Plant Protection Organization has published recommendations to European nations advocating the restriction or banning of the trade in invasive alien plants.

See also 

 Aquatic animal
 Aquatic Botany (journal)
 Aquatic
 Aquatic ecosystem
 Aquatic locomotion
 Aquatic mammal
 Botany
 List of freshwater aquarium plant species
 Marine biology
 Plant community
 Raunkiær plant life-form 
 Terrestrial animal
 Terrestrial ecosystem
 Terrestrial locomotion
 Terrestrial plant
 
 Wetland indicator status

References

External links 

 https://web.archive.org/web/20200410235322/https://aquaplant.tamu.edu/
 http://aswm.org 
 http://plants.ifas.ufl.edu
Aquatic Plant Monitoring in the State of Washington